The women's javelin throw at the 2018 World Para Athletics European Championships was held at the Friedrich-Ludwig-Jahn-Sportpark in Berlin from 20–26 August. 5 classification finals are held in all over this event.

Medalists

See also
List of IPC world records in athletics

References

Javelin throw
2018 in women's athletics
Javelin throw at the World Para Athletics European Championships